The 1945 Syracuse Orangemen football team represented Syracuse University in the 1945 college football season. The Orangemen were led by eighth-year head coach Ossie Solem and played their home games at Archbold Stadium in Syracuse, New York. Solem resigned as head coach following a disappointing 1–6 campaign. The team's sole win came in the school's first-ever match-up with eventual-rival West Virginia.

Schedule

References

Syracuse
Syracuse Orange football seasons
Syracuse Orangemen football